Massimiliano Pedalà (born 22 December 1969 in Cantù, Como) is an Italian auto racing driver.

Career

Early racing included the Italian Renault Mégane SportCup and the European Renault Clio RS Cup. In 2002 he competed in the Italian Alfa 147 Cup, finishing the season fourth on points. From 2004, he has raced in the Italian Renault Clio Cup, winning three successive titles in 2005,2006 and 2007. He also competed in some rounds of the Italian Superturismo Championship with a SEAT Toledo.

His success in the Clios led to a drive in the 2007 FIA World Touring Car Championship, for the independent SEAT Sport Italia Team in a SEAT León. He made just eight starts in the year, with a best placed finish of tenth in round nine at Brno. 
In 2008 he drove in the SEAT León Eurocup for Rangoni Motorsport, ending the season in fourth place.

Complete WTCC results 
(key) (Races in bold indicate pole position) (Races in italics indicate fastest lap)

References

1969 births
Living people
Italian racing drivers
World Touring Car Championship drivers
SEAT León Eurocup drivers

Cupra Racing drivers